The Smithsonian Institution 150th Anniversary commemorative coins are a series of commemorative coins which were issued by the United States Mint in 1996.

Legislation
The Smithsonian Institution Sesquicentennial Commemorative Coin Act of 1995 authorized the production of a silver dollar and a gold half eagle. Congress authorized the coins to commemorate the 150th anniversary of the founding of the Smithsonian Institution in 1846. The act allowed the coins to be struck in both proof and uncirculated finishes. The coins were released August 5, 1996.

Designs

Dollar

The obverse of the Smithsonian Institution 150th Anniversary commemorative dollar, designed by Thomas D. Rogers, features an image of the first Smithsonian Institution building (known as the "Castle"), laurel leaves, and the dual date "1846-1996". The reverse of the coin, designed by John Mercanti, features a design of an allegorical figure carrying the torch of knowledge and sitting atop the world. This figure holds a scroll inscribed with the words, "art, history, and science," and "For the increase and diffusion of knowledge."

Half eagle

The obverse of the Smithsonian Institution 150th Anniversary commemorative half eagle, designed by Alfred Maletsky, features a classical bust of James Smithson with the double date "1846-1996". The reverse of the coin, designed by T. James Ferrell, features a design of the Smithsonian's sunburst logo and the word "Smithsonian".

Specifications
Dollar
 Display Box Color: Dark Blue
 Edge: Reeded
 Weight: 26.730 grams; 0.8594 troy ounce
 Diameter: 38.10 millimeters; 1.50 inches
 Composition: 90% Silver, 10% Copper

Half Eagle
 Display Box Color: Dark Blue
 Edge: Reeded
 Weight: 8.359 grams; 0.2687 troy ounce
 Diameter: 21.59 millimeters; 0.850 inch
 Composition: 90% Gold, 3.6% Silver, 6.4% Copper

See also

 United States commemorative coins
 List of United States commemorative coins and medals (1990s)

References

Commemorative coins of the United States
1996 in the United States